Geophilus aztecus is a species of soil centipede in the family Geophilidae found in Mexico and Guatemala. The original description of this species is based on a dark red specimen measuring 44 mm in length with antennae moniliform at the apex. This species can reach 52 mm in length and has 57 or 59 pairs of legs.

Taxonomy
As Geophilus is a holarctic genus, G. aztecus has almost certainly been misidentified, but as of now has not been correctly reassigned.

References

aztecus
Animals described in 1896
Arthropods of Central America